This is a list of Brazilian television related events from 2012.

Events
29 March - Fael Cordeiro wins the twelfth season of Big Brother Brasil.
16 September - Actor Rodrigo Simas and his partner Raquel Guarini win the ninth season of Dança dos Famosos.
13 December - Everton Silva wins the sixth and final season of Ídolos.
16 December - Ellen Oléria wins the first season of The Voice Brasil.

Debuts
7 January - Sítio do Picapau Amarelo (2012-2016)
23 September - The Voice Brasil (2012–present)

Television shows

1970s
Vila Sésamo (1972-1977, 2007–present)
Turma da Mônica (1976–present)

1990s
Malhação (1995–present)
Cocoricó (1996–present)

2000s
Big Brother Brasil (2002–present)
Dança dos Famosos (2005–present)
Peixonauta (2009–present)

2010s
Meu Amigãozão (2010–present)

Ending this year
Ídolos (2006-2012)

Births

Deaths

See also
2012 in Brazil
List of Brazilian films of 2012